One Direction, often shortened to 1D, are an English-Irish pop boy band formed in London in 2010. The group is composed of Niall Horan, Liam Payne, Harry Styles, Louis Tomlinson, and previously Zayn Malik until his departure from the group in March 2015. The group signed with Simon Cowell's record label Syco Records after forming and finishing third in the seventh series of the British televised singing competition The X Factor in 2010.

Propelled to global success by social media, One Direction's five albums, Up All Night (2011), Take Me Home (2012), Midnight Memories (2013), Four (2014), and Made in the A.M. (2015), topped charts in several countries, and generated hit singles including "What Makes You Beautiful" (their first number one on the UK Singles Chart, and the highest debut for a British act on the US Billboard Hot 100 since 1998), "Live While We're Young", "Best Song Ever", "Story of My Life" and "Drag Me Down". After the release of Four, One Direction became the first band in the US Billboard 200 history to have their first four albums debut at number one. Their third album, Midnight Memories, was the best-selling album worldwide of 2013.

Considered teen idols, One Direction were often subject to fan hysteria. They embarked on four world tours, two of which were all-stadium. The band's Where We Are Tour, in support of Midnight Memories, was the highest-grossing concert tour in 2014, the highest-grossing tour by a vocal group in history, and the 15th highest-grossing concert tour of all time, grossing $290.2 million (unadjusted for inflation). The band went on indefinite hiatus in January 2016, allowing all members to pursue other projects.

As of 2020, the band have sold a total of 70 million records worldwide, making them one of the best-selling boy bands of all time. The band have won nearly 200 awards, including seven Brit Awards, four MTV Video Music Awards, six Billboard Music Awards, seven American Music Awards (including Artist of the Year in 2014 and 2015), and 28 Teen Choice Awards.  In 2013, they earned an estimated $75 million, becoming the second highest earning celebrity under 30 according to Forbes. As the world's best-selling artist of 2013, the group was named the Global Recording Artist of the Year by the International Federation of the Phonographic Industry. In 2014, Billboard named the band "Artist of the Year". Forbes ranked them as the fourth highest-earning celebrities in the world in 2015, and subsequently in second in 2016.

History

2010–2011: The X Factor

Niall Horan, Zayn Malik, Liam Payne, Harry Styles, and Louis Tomlinson auditioned as solo candidates for the 2010 series of the British singing competition The X Factor. They all failed to progress in the "Boys" category at the bootcamp stage of the competition, but were instead put together to form a five-piece boy band, thus qualifying for the "Groups" category. American singer Nicole Scherzinger, a guest judge, and long-time judge Simon Cowell both claimed to have come up with the idea of forming the band. In 2013, Cowell said that it "took [him] 10 minutes to put them together as a group". In 2022, a never-before-seen video proved that Scherzinger did indeed play the most significant role in forming the band. The video revealed Horan being chosen as the band's first member, followed by Styles, Tomlinson, Payne, and Malik. The band got together for two weeks to get to know each other and rehearse. Styles came up with the band's name. For their qualifying song at "judges' houses", and their first song as a group, One Direction sang an acoustic version of "Torn". Cowell later commented that their performance convinced him that they "were confident, fun, like a gang of friends, and kind of fearless as well." Within the first four weeks of the live shows, they were his final act in the competition. The group quickly gained popularity in the UK.

One Direction achieved third place in the competition and immediately after the final, their song "Forever Young", which would have been released if they had won The X Factor, was leaked onto the internet. Shortly afterwards it was confirmed that One Direction had been signed by Cowell to a reported £2 million Syco Records record contract. Recording for their debut album began in January 2011, as they flew to Los Angeles to work with RedOne, a record producer. A book licensed by One Direction, One Direction: Forever Young (Our Official X Factor Story), was published by HarperCollins in February 2011, subsequently topping The Sunday Times Best Seller list. The same month, the boy band and other contestants from the series participated in the X Factor Live Tour. During the tour, the group performed for 500,000 people throughout the UK. After the tour concluded in April 2011, the group continued working on their debut album. Recording took place in Stockholm, London and Los Angeles, as One Direction worked with producers Carl Falk, Savan Kotecha, Steve Mac, and Rami Yacoub, among others.

2011–2012: Up All Night
Released in September 2011 in the UK and Ireland, One Direction's debut single, "What Makes You Beautiful", was a commercial and international success. It reached number one on the UK Singles Chart after becoming the most pre-ordered Sony Music Entertainment single in history. Subsequent singles, "Gotta Be You" and "One Thing", peaked in the UK Singles Chart top ten. In November 2011, they signed a record deal with Columbia Records in North America. Steve Barnett, the co-chairman of Columbia Records, said it was not a difficult decision to sign One Direction; "I just thought there was a void, and maybe they could seize and hold it." That same month, they released Up All Night, their debut studio album, in the UK and Ireland. Critically commended for its appeal to the teenage audience, it became the UK's fastest-selling debut album of 2011. In December 2011, they embarked on their first headlining UK concert tour, the Up All Night Tour.

Upon One Direction's arrival in the US in February 2012, the group embarked on a radio promotion spree, as well as their first North American concert tour as an opening act for Big Time Rush, opening 16 shows after they had completed the first leg of the Up All Night Tour. That month, they announced that an Oceania leg had been added to the tour. They made their first US television appearance on The Today Show, at the Rockefeller Center; an estimated 15,000 fans descended on the plaza. "What Makes You Beautiful" was officially released in the United States that same month, where it debuted on the Billboard Hot 100 at number 28, becoming the highest debut for a British act since 1998. On the US Billboard Hot 100, it reached as high as number four. As of June 2016, it has sold 4.8 million copies in the US and over 7 million copes worldwide. Up All Night was released internationally in March, and One Direction became the first UK group to have their debut album reach number one in the US, and were inducted into the Guinness World Records as a result. After the album's international release, it topped the charts in sixteen countries. Up All Night also became the first album by a boy band to sell 500,000 digital copies in the US and, by August 2012, had sold over 3 million copies worldwide. It was the third global best-selling album of the year, selling 4.5 million copies. Following the success of the album, a North American leg of the tour was announced later that month.

The Up All Night Tour, comprising 62 shows, was met with positivity both critically and commercially, with critics praising their singing abilities and stage presence, and with tickets selling out in minutes. A recording of a concert from the tour, Up All Night: The Live Tour, was released in May 2012. In addition to the DVD topping the charts in twenty-five countries, its global sales had exceeded 1 million copies by August 2012. One Direction's first book to be licensed in America, Dare to Dream: Life as One Direction, published in the US in May 2012, topped The New York Times Best Seller list. In June 2012, Nick Gatfield, the chairman and chief executive officer of Sony Music Entertainment UK, stated how he expects One Direction to represent a $100 million business empire over 2013. Gatfield stated, "What you might not know about One Direction is that they already represent a $50 million business and that's a figure we expect to double next year". In August 2012, the group's record sales exceeded 8 million singles, 3 million albums, and 1 million DVDs, and they performed "What Makes You Beautiful" at the 2012 Summer Olympics closing ceremony in London, which represented the handover to Rio de Janeiro as the host of the 2016 Summer Olympics. One Direction were the biggest winners of the 2012 MTV Video Music Awards winning their three nominations on 6 September 2012, including Best New Artist.

In April 2012, an American band that went by the same name filed a trademark infringement lawsuit. According to the lawsuit, the US band had been using the name since 2009, recorded two albums and filed an application to register the trademark name in the US in February 2011. The US band said they were entitled to three times the profits made by the UK band, as well as compensatory damages in excess of US$1 million. The lawsuit claimed that Syco and Sony Music "chose to ignore the plaintiff's rights and wilfully infringed them" after they realised in early 2011 that the two bands shared the same name. Syco Records subsequently counter-sued, suggesting the US group was trying to make money from One Direction's success and that the boy band was the first to use the name in US interstate commerce. The BBC reported in September 2012 that the UK group won the legal dispute over the right to keep using their band name; the US band changed its name to Uncharted Shores. The change of name was announced in a joint statement that also noted both groups were happy with the outcome.

2012–2013: Take Me Home

In September 2012, "Live While We're Young", the lead single from the group's second album, was released, and was a global success. It reached the top ten in almost every country it charted in and recorded the highest one-week opening sales figure for a song by a non-US artist in the US. A second single, "Little Things", resulted in the band's second number one single in the UK. In November 2012, One Direction's second studio album, Take Me Home, was released. Take Me Home sold 540,000 copies in its first week in the US, debuted atop the Billboard 200, and topped the charts in more than thirty-four other countries. Additionally, Up All Night and Take Me Home were the number three and number four best-selling albums of 2012 globally, each album selling over 4.4 million units worldwide. Upon reaching number one on the Billboard 200, the group became the first boy band in US chart history to record two number-one albums in the same calendar year alongside becoming the first group since 2008 to record two number-one albums in the same year. One Direction became the first group ever to have their first two albums reach atop the Billboard 200. The album and "Little Things" both debuted at number one in the UK simultaneously, making One Direction the youngest act in British chart history to achieve that.

Take Me Home was written in groups and has an average of just under five songwriters per track. Savan Kotecha, Rami Yacoub, and Carl Falk, who composed One Direction's hits "What Makes You Beautiful" and "One Thing", spent six months in Stockholm developing songs for the album, and were able to shape melodies around their tones. One Direction began recording the album in May 2012, in Stockholm at Kinglet Studios. The album cover artwork features the group surrounding a traditional British K2 red telephone box, a familiar sight on the streets of the UK. Take Me Home garnered generally favorable reviews from music critics. There was praise for its quality of production although it was criticised for its generic, rushed nature.

One Direction performed "Little Things" at the 2012 Royal Variety Performance in the presence of Queen Elizabeth II, and headlined a sold-out show at New York City's Madison Square Garden on 3 December 2012. In February 2013, One Direction released a cover version of "One Way or Another" and "Teenage Kicks", "One Way or Another (Teenage Kicks)", as the 2013 Comic Relief single. The charity single reached number one in the UK and Ireland alongside various other countries while peaking at 13 in the US. As part of their involvement with the UK charity, One Direction travelled to Ghana to volunteer at a children's hospital, visit a school and make donations.

Following the release of Take Me Home, One Direction embarked on their second concert tour and first all-arena tour in February 2013, the Take Me Home Tour. The concert tour consisted of 123 shows in Europe, North America, Asia, and Oceania. Ticket sales reached 300,000 within a day of release in the UK and Ireland, which included a six-date sell-out at the O2 Arena in London. In the Australian and New Zealand markets, tickets grossed US$15.7 million, with all 190,000 tickets being sold for the eighteen shows to be held. The tour received critical acclaim from music critics who praised the band's live vocals and their performance abilities and was a commercial success, selling 1,635,000 tickets from 134 shows. In total, the tour grossed $114 million. The Official Charts Company revealed that One Direction had sold 2,425,000 records in the UK by February 2013.

2013–2014: Midnight Memories and This Is Us

"Best Song Ever", the lead single of the group's then-upcoming third studio album Midnight Memories, was released on 22 July 2013. The song is their highest charting single in the US to date, reaching number two. It broke the 24-Hour Vevo Record with 10.9 million views on YouTube (this was the second time the band held the record with "Live While We're Young" attaining 8.2 million views on 20 September 2012). One Direction: This Is Us, a 3D documentary and concert film about the group directed by Morgan Spurlock and produced by Spurlock, Ben Winston, Adam Milano and Simon Cowell, was released by TriStar Pictures on 30 August 2013. The film was a box office success, topping the UK and US box offices and grossing over $60 million worldwide, and became the fourth highest-grossing concert movie.

On 16 May 2013, the band announced their first all-stadium tour, the Where We Are Tour. Tickets for the tour sold out in minutes and more shows were added due to "overwhelming demand". On 23 November 2013, in support of Midnight Memories, the band participated in "1D Day", a day dedicated to One Direction fans. The day constituted of a landmark 7.5-hour socially interactive YouTube live-stream featuring live band performances, celebrity guests including, Simon Cowell, Cindy Crawford, Piers Morgan, and Jerry Springer. On 28 October 2013, the second single from Midnight Memories, "Story of My Life", was released, charting at number six in the US and at number two in the UK, while charting at number one in countries such as Mexico, Spain, Bulgaria, Denmark, and Ireland.

Midnight Memories was released globally on 25 November 2013. It debuted at number one in the UK and in the US, making them the first group to debut at number one on the Billboard 200 with its first three albums, and the second to reach the top after The Monkees in 1967. The album has since been recognized as a turning point in the musical style of the band, with sites quoting it as having a "significant shift in sound" in addition to the solos in songs being more evenly spread out in contrast to their previous two albums. 15 of the album's 18 songs were written by members in the band (Tomlinson being the leader with 12 writing credits) compared to only four songs being written by the group on Take Me Home and three on Up All Night. The album was described by the band as edgier and as having a "slightly rockier tone" than their previous efforts. Despite being released at the year's end, it was the best-selling album worldwide in 2013 with 4 million copies sold globally. To promote the album, the band performed on both the American and British versions of The X Factor.

In December 2013, One Direction broke yet another UK sales record with the DVD and Blu-ray release of This Is Us. Nearly 270,000 copies of the film were sold in the UK within three days of its release, beating the record previously set by Michael Jackson's This Is It in 2010 by 10,000 copies. The group was named among the Top Global artists of 2013 by the IFPI because of strong digital downloads, physical albums, on-demand streams, and music videos. In 2013, they became the first boy band in history to gross $1 billion dollars.

The band embarked on the Where We Are Tour on 25 April 2014, and it was concluded on 5 October 2014. Playing 69 shows with an average of 49,848 fans per show, the tour grossed over $290 million, becoming the highest-grossing concert tour in 2014 (grossing $87 million more than the second highest-grossing tour, Justin Timberlake's The 20/20 Experience World Tour), the 15th highest-grossing concert tour of all time, and the highest-grossing tour of all time by a vocal group. The tour was attended by 3.4 million fans. In August of that same year, the group released their third book, One Direction: Where We Are: Our Band, Our Story: 100% Official.

2014–2015: Four 

On 21 July 2014, One Direction announced One Direction: Where We Are - The Concert Film, a film which documents the concerts of 28 and 29 June 2014 that took place in San Siro Stadium during their Where We Are Tour. After the announcement, the band announced the film would also have a limited 10–11 October 2014 international cinema release before its home media release in November 2014. The group also released an autobiography book titled Who We Are on 25 September 2014.

On 8 September 2014, One Direction announced their fourth studio album to be titled Four, set to be released on 17 November 2014. As part of the announcement, one of the songs from the album, "Fireproof" was released for free download for 24 hours on their official website. "Steal My Girl", the album's lead single, was released on 29 September 2014,
receiving critical acclaim for its classic rock sound. The second single from the album, "Night Changes", was released on 14 November, three days before the album's release. It also achieve platinum status, selling over one million units in the United States. Four was released on 17 November 2014, topping the Billboard 200 and the UK Album Chart. In total, in debuted at number one in 18 countries, selling 3.2 million copies. It became the top charted album on iTunes in 67 countries. One Direction became the only group in the 58-year history of the Billboard 200 albums chart to have their first four albums debut at number one. In February 2015, the group embarked on their fourth world tour and second all-stadium tour, the On the Road Again Tour, grossing $208 million, making it the second highest-grossing tour of 2015.

2015–2017: Malik's departure, Made in the A.M. and hiatus
On 25 March 2015, the band released a statement announcing Malik's departure. In the official statement, Malik stated "I’d like to apologise to the fans if I’ve let anyone down, but I have to do what feels right in my heart" and that "I am leaving because I want to be a normal 22-year-old who is able to relax and have some private time out of the spotlight. I know I have four friends for life in Louis, Liam, Harry and Niall. I know they will continue to be the best band in the world." Malik denied rumours of any rift between the members and stated "my band has been really supportive". In later interviews, Malik stated that he left the group due to being unhappy with the group's musical direction and his inability to "put any input in". The group made their first official public appearance as a four-piece on The Late Late Show with James Corden on 14 May, where they confirmed that they would continue working without a new fifth member. The On the Road Again tour concluded on 31 October 2015 after playing eighty shows in stadiums across Australia, Asia, Africa, Europe, and North America. Grossing $208 million, over 2.3 million tickets were sold.

On 31 July 2015, the group released "Drag Me Down" without promotional material or announcement. Despite this, it still topped the charts in multiple countries, including France and Australia, making the song their first single to reach number one in those respective countries. It also reached number one in multiple other countries, including Ireland and the UK, while charting third in the United States. The single was the first single from their fifth studio album, Made in the A.M., and the first material released by the group after Malik's departure. On 22 September, Made in the A.M. was officially announced along with promotional single "Infinity" being released. The group began to reveal the track listing on their Snapchat stories to which it was later confirmed on iTunes. In October, another single, "Perfect", was released. It reached the Billboard top ten, making it the group's second consecutive (after "Drag Me Down") and fifth overall top ten hit, breaking The Beatles' record for the most top ten Hot 100 debuts among bands.

In August 2015, it was revealed that the group would be going on hiatus in 2016 to work on individual projects but that "they will remain together and plan to work together in the future". Styles stated in a 2017 interview that he was the first member of the group to bring up the idea of the hiatus in late 2014, saying he "didn't want to exhaust our fanbase" and that all members later eventually agreed. Tomlinson later stated in a 2020 interview that he was "fuming" and not ready when the idea was brought up and that "even though I don’t fully understand everyone’s individual reasons, I respect them".

Made in the A.M. was released on 13 November 2015, topping the charts in the UK among other countries while reaching number two in the U.S. It was the sixth-best selling album of 2015. At the 2015 American Music Awards on 22 November, One Direction won the award for Artist of the Year for the second year in succession. On 13 December, One Direction performed on The X Factor final. Their last televised performance as a group, before their hiatus, was on Dick Clark's New Year's Rockin' Eve on 31 December 2015.

On 13 January 2016, Us Weekly published a report claiming that the group's hiatus would become a permanent split, with unnamed sources citing that each of the four remaining group members did not renew their contracts following the completion of the On The Road Again Tour in October 2015. Representatives for the group denied the report in a statement to Billboard, stating, "nothing has changed regarding hiatus plans for the group, and all will be revealed in due time from the band members' own mouths." By May 2017, all members of the group had released solo singles. Since then, all band members have pursued other projects and released at least one solo album.

At the 2017 Brit Awards, One Direction won the Video of the Year award for their song "History". Payne, the only member in attendance, accepted the award on the behalf of the band. In February 2018, it was reported that the group had folded its touring company after applying for removal within the Companies House registry in October 2017.

Artistry

One Direction's debut studio album, Up All Night (2011), is predominantly a pop music record, containing elements of teen pop, dance-pop, pop rock, with electropop and rock influences. Digital Spy's Robert Copsey described the album as a "collection of PG pop rock with killer choruses", while The New York Times considered it "full of easy rock-inflected pop, blithe and sometimes clever". Jason Lipshutz of Billboard acknowledged that the album demonstrates an originality in sound that was "necessary for the revitalization of the boy band movement". The songs "One Thing" and "What Makes You Beautiful" were particularly noted for the genres of power pop and pop rock, for their "powerhouse" guitar riffs and "forceful" choruses.

Their second studio album, Take Me Home (2012), is characterised by rock-inherited pop, prominent electric guitar riffs, bright synthesisers, a homogeneous sound and message, and the pitch-correcting software Auto-Tune. Alexis Petridis of The Guardian interpreted its signature sound as a "peppy, synth-bolstered take on early-80s new-wave pop, heavy on clipped rhythms and chugging guitars", which, he said, is at least an improvement on the substitute contemporary R&B "that was once the grim lot of the boyband". Jon Caramanica, writing in The New York Times, considered the album "far more mechanical" than their debut album, although noted that it is sonically and lyrically similar. The album's lyricism speaks of falling in love, unrequited love, the insistence that flaws are what make a person unique, commitment, jealousy and longing for past significant others.

Erica Futterman for Rolling Stone favoured their live acoustic performances as both showing, "Horan's ability to play guitar, as well as One Direction's admirable live vocals. There was no need to worry about a backing track or a bum note, a pleasant realization at a pop show." Herald Suns Cameron Adams opined that One Direction have "strong pop voices". Melody Lau of the National Post wrote, "It's easy to get lost in inherent appeal of their perfectly coiffed dos and almost-too-put-together preppy style but somewhere in the midst of all the love-struck squeals of teenage girls are guys who can actually sing and, to a certain extent, entertain." Jane Stevenson of the portal site Canoe concurred: "What I didn't really prepare myself for was that they all can actually sing in concert." Chris Richards, writing in The Washington Post, dissented from the approval: "As the five traded couplets, it was tough to imagine a future Justin Timberlake, Ricky Martin or Bobby Brown emerging from the pack. No one voice stood out." Mike Wass of Idolator felt One Direction's "surprisingly accomplished effort" of Kings of Leon's "Use Somebody" proved that One Direction are "more than capable" of evolving their sound.

Their third album Midnight Memories (2013) is a pop rock record, a slight departure from the band's original teen pop sound. Liam Payne called Midnight Memories a "slightly rockier and edgier" album than their previous material. The album is heavily influenced by 80's rock and folk music and briefly integrates elements of dubstep, notably in "Little White Lies". The album's lyrical themes primarily revolve around love, heartbreak and sexual intercourse. Many critics praised its lyrical depth and musical composition, as well as the group's level of involvement in the production process.

Their fourth album Four (2014) was released on 17 November 2014. Payne once again claimed that the album would be "edgier" and that the group had written most of the songs for it; Horan came up with the name of the album, commemorating the fact that it is One Direction's fourth record to date and that it has been four years since the band's formation. Signifying a further maturation of their pop sound, the album's first single, "Steal My Girl", was dubbed by Billboard as "no What Makes You Beautiful, but its Coldplay-like piano pop could be a good direction", and that the band was "not entirely ready to let go of its bubble-gum days". Rolling Stone described the record as "saturated with retro vibes"; its songs "split the difference between big, splashy Eighties pop rock and more elegant Seventies flavours – a very pesky whipper-snapper move that's not so far from what Haim's hit "Days Are Gone" did last year".

Other ventures

Endorsements
In 2011, One Direction became the face of Pokémon Black and White, starring in a series of television adverts. They were the first installments in the fifth generation of the Pokémon series of role-playing games. They also launched Nokia C3 and Nokia C2-02 phones. To promote the launch Nokia made a series of photos of the band members using the phones to take photos of themselves.

In 2012, they teamed up with Colgate to launch their own One Direction Colgate MaxFresh Power Toothbrush, the One Direction Colgate Maxfresh Manual Toothbrush, and the One Direction Colgate MaxFresh Toothpaste. The band was signed by Pepsi in a multimillion-dollar advertising deal in 2012. Social media marketing included a tie up with Shazam, whereby consumers that used the digital music app in conjunction with the ad both on TV and online were able to view exclusive content and link back to iTunes to buy One Direction's single, "Live While We're Young". Mini figures based on members of the group were launched for the band's US fans after the agreement was signed by American firm Hasbro. In October 2012, the band also signed up to endorse Filipino clothing brand, Penshoppe.

In 2013, One Direction announced pop-up shops around the world, including Brisbane, Toronto, Chicago, New York, Tokyo and Stockholm, selling exclusive merchandise. Nabisco became the title sponsor of One Direction's North American tour. The band became the new faces of Toyota VIOS, releasing behind-the-scenes look at their commercial for the vehicle. One Direction's debut fragrance, Our Moment, launched at Harrods in London and on their website in 2013. The full length advert for the fragrance was released on 24 August 2013, featuring the song "My Favourite Things". The perfume was the best-selling famous fragrance of Christmas 2013. In 2014, the band released their second scent That Moment. The fragrance was released with a matching shower gel and body lotion. They released a commercial for their third fragrance, "You & I", named after their 2014 song of the same name.

In 2015, One Direction appeared in an advert for the Toyota Vios, which aired in Thailand. Coca-Cola Mexico launched the session and full interview with One Direction, with a series of commercials in which Tomlinson, Payne, Styles and Horan showed us what it means to be a True Friend. One Direction revealed their fourth fragrance ‘Between Us’ at The Sanderson in London, England on 24 June. The band appeared in a Honda Civic ad which shows the quartet testing out the car's stereo, style and trunk space with a humorous tone and the tagline "It's all One Direction approved." The ad is set to the 1D single "Drag Me Down". The group's 2015 U.S. tour was also supported by Honda.

Philanthropy
In 2011, the band performed on the BBC's Children in Need 2011 charity telethon. In 2012, they extended their involvement with Children in Need as they opened the telecast with a performance of their single "Live While We're Young". A prominent annual event in British television, the group said it was "incredible" to be involved in Children in Need as it was something that they had "always watched as children".

In February 2013, One Direction released "One Way or Another (Teenage Kicks)" (a medley of "One Way or Another" and "Teenage Kicks") as the 2013 single for the UK's other major charity telethon Comic Relief. For ITV's Santa charity Christmas campaign, they filmed a set of pleas to their fans and the general public, asking them to donate £2. The band have made numerous other appearances for charitable causes, including the 2011 Pride of Britain Awards where they presented 13-year-old quadruple amputee Danielle Bailey the Child of Courage award at her school assembly, and the 2014 Royal Variety Performance where they played in front of Prince William and Catherine at the London Palladium.

In September 2012, Niall Horan organised an event to raise money for Irish Autism Action and another charity, called Temporary Emergency Accommodation Mullingar, based in his hometown. Due to overwhelming demand to participate in the fundraising, the ticket website for the event broke down. Horan's brother Greg commented on the website crash, saying that "there were 500 tickets and they were all snapped up pretty quick".

In 2013, band members Liam Payne and Harry Styles partnered with Trekstock, a leading cancer charity to help raise money for cancer research. As ambassadors of the charity, the duo collaborated to offer the chance for one fan and a friend to win an evening out with them in return for a donation to the charity as part of an exclusive "#HangwithLiam&Harry" global campaign. They had originally set a goal of raising $500,000 and ended up raising $784,984. Trekstock later added that this amount would allow them to "complete funding of their Hodgkin's lymphoma trial, in the hope of offering a much brighter future to thousands of children and young people affected by this form of disease". One Direction were named the most charitable in 2013 behind Taylor Swift by social change organisation DoSomething.org. On 30 May 2013, the band announced a partnership with Office Depot on a limited-edition capsule collection of back to school supplies. They also confirmed that a portion of the proceeds from the alliance would go toward an anti-bullying educational program intended to promote kinder behaviour in schools.

In 2014, One Direction donated £600,000 for the Stand up to Cancer campaign by giving portions of their ticket sales revenues from their Where We Are Tour. On 15 November 2014, One Direction joined the charity group Band Aid 30 along with other British and Irish pop acts, recording the latest version of the track "Do They Know It's Christmas?" at Sarm West Studios in Notting Hill, London, to raise money for the 2014 Ebola crisis in Western Africa.

In 2015, One Direction launched 'Action 1D' campaign to raise awareness of global issues. The initiative aims to end extreme poverty, tackle inequality and slow down climate change with the help of their millions of fans. It is part of the wider action/2015 campaign, a global citizen's movement that is all about the idea that 2015 can be the year when the world can set the agenda to end major global issues. One Direction will be asking their fans to describe the kind of world they want to live in by sharing powerful pieces of creative content, including videos and photos, using the hashtag #Action1D. The quartet also starred in a campaign video, appealing to fans to join the movement.

Image

During the mid-2010s, One Direction were dubbed as teen idols, and were often subject to fan hysteria. Neil McCormick of The Daily Telegraph, in an article on One Direction's success in North America, notes that Americans had left a gap in the market and it took the prominence of Justin Bieber to demonstrate that there still was a market for "clean cut, wholesome, whiter-than-white, middle class parent friendly pop: cute boys advocating puppy love. And what could be better than one cute boy, if not five?" Bill Werde, a representative of Billboard magazine, commented, "There's a lot of possibility here, there's a lot of upside, that level of talent with those kinds of looks, it's really a perfect storm for a massive, massive successful phenomenon." In NPR, Maria Sherman noticed that before One Direction's breakthrough, boy bands were "off the radar" since NSYNC went on an indefinite hiatus in 2002.

Horan commented on One Direction as a boy band, "People think that a boy band is air-grabs and [being] dressed in all one colour. We're boys in a band. We're trying to do something different from what people would think is the typical kind of boy band. We're trying to do different kinds of music and we're just trying to be ourselves, not squeaky clean." Leah Collins, writing for the National Post, remarked they had succeeded on the latter front. "For the most part, that just means the group presents themselves as typical, goofy and uncensored teenage boys – posting jokey YouTube videos, for instance, or boozing at awards shows." Writing for The Observer, Kitty Empire opined, "One Direction fulfill a great many boy band prerequisites (looks, soppy lyrics, tune-grasp, fame-lust) but their lack of routines points to the subtle digressions afoot here". Each member's individual identity is reinforced by their intentionally different personal styles. Caroline Watson, the band's original stylist, spoke about styling the band, "At the beginning I didn't want them all in black or all in leather – that whole stereotypical boy band thing." Instead, her original idea was for them to be the "male equivalent to the Spice Girls", with each member being a part of the group but still having his own individual style.

Legacy

One Direction have been described as sparking a resurgence in the interest in boy bands as well as forming part of a new "British Invasion" (along with acts like Adele) in the United States.  Many media outlets noted that One Direction was the first boyband to rise to and eventually surpass a level of popularity comparable to NSYNC, Backstreet Boys, and New Kids on the Block before their respective hiatuses and breakups. HuffPost wrote that "One Direction’s level of fame surpassed anything that modern audiences had seen" and that "fans and non-fans alike widely agree that such intense levels of fandom hadn’t been seen since The Beatles in the 1960s". NPR described the group as "one of the biggest boy bands the world had ever seen" and the group has been described as "the world's biggest boy band" as recently as 2020, four years since their hiatus. Rolling Stone named "What Makes You Beautiful" the sixth greatest boy band song of all time. Billboard named Four the best boy band album of the last thirty years, calling it "the absolute standard-bearer for the last decade of pop". One Direction's music was considered pop that was rooted in guitar rock which was rare during their active years, with Rolling Stone calling the group "one of the great rock bands of the 21st century."

One Direction was widely considered the biggest boy band in the world with band "barreling into international success" and falling into "seemingly effortless superstardom". Their main "competitor," in terms of boy bands, was The Wanted, who formed in 2009 (one year prior to One Direction), with many expecting a "rivalry" between the two groups similar to the one between NSYNC and the Backstreet Boys. However, in a 2014 story by Billboard, they wrote "the boy band war was over before it even began" and that "the boy band war was not a war at all; it had been a one-sided stomping". The Wanted went on indefinite hiatus in 2014, and they cited One Direction's global success as part of the reason, saying "One Direction are a phenomenon that no one else can compete with" and "For The Wanted to try and compete against one of the biggest bands in the world ... it's almost impossible".

One Direction's rise to fame has been called "meteoric" with the group becoming the first British band to ever have their debut album top the US charts. Forbes noted that their "meteoric rise has surpassed any other boy band in history, NSYNC included". During their continued rise in the United States in 2012, the mania surrounding the group was dubbed "One Direction Infection". That same year, "1D World" stores were opened around the United States as the group worked on their second studio album to meet the high demand for the band and "to give fans the ultimate One Direction experience". Part of the group's rise to popularity was their "atypical construct" in the sense that they don't dance, rarely wear matching outfits, and are heavily tattooed, all three which were rare in boybands of the past. The Huffington Post added that they “didn't just sing cheesy ballads" and instead "embraced their differences". Slate noted that One Direction portrayed more of a "joking" and "fun" manner in their songs, music videos, and individual personas when compared to boy bands of the past. They were credited with breaking "the boy band mold." Despite their differences in that regard, the group still used an approach pioneered by The Beatles in which each member was applied a persona; Horan as "the cute Irish one", Malik as "the quiet and mysterious one", Payne as "the sensible one", Styles as "the charming flirt" and Tomlinson as "the funny one". TMRW Magazine wrote in a 2020 story that the group "helped defy traits typically associated with toxic masculinity" and that "their friendship set them apart, made them more real".

One Direction are also widely considered to have been one of the first groups and celebrities to have been propelled to global recognition by social media. Sonny Takhar, the chief executive officer of Syco Records, attributes the breakthrough to the power of social media, saying "sometimes you feel the song's the star, but it's not like that here – it's the act," he said. "It's a real moment. Social media has become the new radio, it's never broken an act globally like this before." Will Bloomfield, the group's manager, added, "These guys live online, and so do their fans." Their management employs a social media team and the members all tweet themselves, "which helps create the illusion that they couldn't be any closer to their fans", according to Caspar Llewellyn Smith, writing for The Guardian. Sunil Singhvi, Twitter head of entertainment in the UK, stated that "the fans' ability, via Twitter, to tell Europeans about One Direction really catapulted them there, then from Europe to America, and now it's a global phenomenon." Savan Kotecha, who wrote multiple songs for the band, said in an interview with Rolling Stone that “they instinctively had this - [...] they just knew how to speak to their fans. And they did that by being themselves. That was a unique thing about these boys: When the cameras turned on, they didn’t change who they were”. Their rise in success has been greatly credited to social media, which allowed fans to not only spread the word about the group, but get live updates from concerts and interviews as well as about the band's whereabouts daily. One Direction, in their active years, were extremely present on social media and interacted with fans daily, giving them "an army of online fans." The Detroit News named them "the first megastar boyband of the Social Media Era."

In 2017, ABC premiered the television series Boy Band which aims to find male vocalists to become a member of a new five-piece boy band. Many media outlets suspected the show's premise and inspiration was to find "the next One Direction".

Fandom 
One Direction's fans dubbed themselves as "Directioners" and were considered one of the largest fandoms on the internet.  Huffington Post noted the fandom as "making news for forming unprecedented mobs outside hotels, at airports and outside concert venues. For years, the boys would discreetly exit buildings to remain safe". The Independent wrote that "the legacy of One Direction isn't anything to do with the 1D boys or Simon Cowell, but the extraordinary power of teenage girls" while calling them "sole engineers of the band’s unbelievable success" and "alchemists". A 2022 article by Fast Company writes that "One Direction fangirls made the internet a better place" and that "we should thank Harry Styles-obsessed fandoms for shaping our social interactions online". In a 2020 story in honor of the band's 10-year anniversary, Billboard wrote that their "groundbreaking success" was "all made possible by the group’s fervent international fanbase, characterized by its rabid devotion and accelerated by the rise of social media and music streaming, ultimately rivaling the fandom of any other boy band in history". After Malik left the band in March 2015, fan reactions went viral on social media, with Bustle titling an article "Zayn leaves, fans lose it". Specifically, candlelight vigils held in memory of Malik went viral, with sites like Rolling Stone writing stories over fan reactions. In 2022, Kaitlyn Tiffany released a book titled Everything I Need I Get From You: How Fangirls Created the Internet as We Know It, focusing on the cultural impact and online community created by Directioners.

10-year anniversary event 
On 22 July 2020, One Direction posted on their Twitter, Instagram and YouTube accounts an image with the words "10 Years of One Direction" and the caption "Tomorrow! You and me got a whole lot of history #10YearsOf1D" in anticipation of their tenth anniversary the following day. The Instagram post received 7.5 million likes. The tweet received 1.8 million likes and the hashtag "10YearsofOneDirection" trended on Twitter.

On 23 July, One Direction launched a new anniversary website, however, the site crashed shortly after its announcement due to the high volume of fans entering at once. Members Payne, Horan, Tomlinson and Styles also posted on their individual social media pages, thanking their fans and all five initial members for their support. Styles' tweet reached one million likes in just over an hour, making it the fastest tweet ever to reach one million likes.

On 23 July, One Direction premiered a retrospective video in celebration of their anniversary. Select remastered 4K versions of their past music videos and concert recordings were released between 23 and 28 July.

Discography 

 Up All Night (2011)
 Take Me Home (2012)
 Midnight Memories (2013)
 Four (2014)
 Made in the A.M. (2015)

Filmography

Tours

Headlining
Up All Night Tour (2011–12)
Take Me Home Tour (2013)
Where We Are Tour (2014)
On the Road Again Tour (2015)

Opening act
X Factor Tour 2011 (2011)
Better with U Tour  (2012)

Awards and honours

As of 2020, One Direction have sold a total of 70 million records worldwide, making them one of the best-selling boy bands of all time. In 2013, they earned an estimated $75 million, becoming the second highest earning celebrity under 30 according to Forbes. Forbes ranked them as the fourth highest-earning celebrities in the world in 2015, and second in 2016.

The band has received seven Brit Awards, seven American Music Awards, six Billboard Music Awards, five Billboard Touring Awards, and four MTV Video Music Awards, among other awards. One Direction holds the record as the most awarded act at the Teen Choice Awards with 28 wins from 31 nominations. Being the world's best-selling artist of 2013, the International Federation of the Phonographic Industry (IFPI) named them the Global Recording Artist of the Year. In 2014, Billboard named the band "Artist of the Year".

Publications
 One Direction: Forever Young, HarperCollins (17 February 2011) 
 One Direction: The Official Annual 2012, HarperCollins (1 September 2011) 
 Dare to Dream: Life as One Direction, HarperCollins (15 September 2011) 
 One Direction: Where We Are: Our Band, Our Story: 100% Official, HarperCollins (19 November 2013) 
 One Direction: Who We Are: Our Official Autobiography, HarperCollins (25 September 2014)

Further reading

See also
 Best-selling boy bands
 List of Billboard Social 50 number-one artists
 List of artists who reached number one on the UK Singles Chart
 List of highest-grossing concert tours

Explanatory notes

References

External links

 
 
 

 
2010 establishments in England
ARIA Award winners
Brit Award winners
Columbia Records artists
English boy bands
English pop music groups
English pop rock music groups
English vocal groups
MTV Europe Music Award winners
Musical groups established in 2010
Musical groups from London
NME Awards winners
Shorty Award winners
Sony BMG artists
Sony Music Publishing artists
Syco Music artists
Teen pop groups
Vocal quartets
Vocal quintets
The X Factor (British TV series) contestants